John Penrose (born 1611) was an English politician who sat in the House of Commons  from 1646 to 1648.

Penrose was the son of John Penrose of Helston and his wife Jane Trefusis. In 1645, Penrose was elected Member of Parliament for Helston in the Long Parliament.  In 1647 he was a commissioner for raising money in Cornwall.  In December 1648 he was one of the commissioners for settling militia throughout England and Wales. He is not recorded as sitting in the Rump Parliament after Pride's Purge.

Penrose married Amy Buggs and had four daughters and a son.

References

1611 births
Year of death missing
Members of the pre-1707 English Parliament for constituencies in Cornwall
Place of birth missing
English MPs 1640–1648